Labeobarbus sacratus is a species of ray-finned fish in the genus Labeobarbus from West Africa.

References

 

sacratus
Taxa named by Jacques Daget
Fish described in 1963